The 1938 Lafayette Leopards football team was an American football team that represented Lafayette College in the Middle Three Conference during the 1938 college football season. In its second  season under head coach Edward Mylin, the team compiled a 5–3 record. Harold Simmons and Norbert Weldon were the team captains.

Schedule

References

Lafayette
Lafayette Leopards football seasons
Lafayette Leopards football